Alucita hypocosma is a moth of the family Alucitidae. It is found in north-eastern China.

References

External links
 Alucita hypocosma from Encyclopedia of Life

Moths described in 1934
Alucitidae
Moths of Asia
Taxa named by Edward Meyrick